Donald C. Orr was an American football player and official. He was born in Miami, Florida.

Vanderbilt University
Orr was a prominent quarterback for the Vanderbilt Commodores football teams of Vanderbilt University.

1955

Orr led Vanderbilt to its first bowl victory by defeating Auburn 25 to 13 in the 1955 Gator Bowl. He was selected Vanderbilt's MVP of the game, and received a standing ovation upon getting the award. Vandy's first two scores were a pass Orr to Joe Stephenson and a run by Orr respectively.

NFL draft
He was drafted by the Chicago Bears in 26th round of the 1956 NFL Draft; but he never talked to the team.

Official
Orr was a prominent National Football League (NFL) official for 25 seasons, from 1971 through 1995, serving as a field judge in three Super Bowls.
He wore uniform number 77 for the majority of his NFL career. As a side judge in the 1979 AFC Championship Game between the Houston Oilers and the Pittsburgh Steelers, Orr made a controversial incomplete pass call denying Oilers receiver Mike Renfro an apparent game-tying touchdown late in the third quarter. The Oilers subsequently settled for a field goal and went on to lose 27–13. The controversy prompted calls for the NFL to institute replay review.

Contracting
Orr is recently chairman of the board of Nashville Machine Co., a mechanical contracting company.

References

Possibly living people
American football quarterbacks
National Football League officials
Vanderbilt Commodores football players